The 2006–07 season was the 59th season in the existence of FC Steaua București and the club's 59th consecutive season in the top flight of Romanian football. In addition to the domestic league, Steaua București participated in this season's edition of the Cupa României, the Supercupa României, the UEFA Champions League and the UEFA Cup.

Players

First-team squad

Squad at end of season

Transfers

In

Out

Loan out

Competitions

Overall record

Supercupa României

Results

Liga I

League table

Results summary

Results by round

Matches

Cupa României

Results

UEFA Champions League

Qualifying rounds

Second qualifying round

Third qualifying round

Group stage

Results

UEFA Cup

Knockout stage

Round of 32

References

FC Steaua București seasons
Steaua Bucuresti